
The Palestine Pilgrims' Text Society (PPTS) was a text publication society based in London, which specialised in publishing editions and translations of medieval texts relevant to the history of pilgrimage to the Holy Land. Particular attention was given to accounts by pilgrims and other travellers containing geographical or topographical information, as well as those which discussed the manners and customs of the Holy Land. The original narratives were written in a variety of languages, including Greek, Latin, Arabic, Hebrew, Old French, Russian, and German.

The Society first started publishing its work in 1884, and continued for eleven years, publishing a total of twelve volumes. In 1896, these works were transferred to the Palestine Exploration Fund, for distribution to the members of the PPTS.

The editions remain valuable and are frequently cited in scholarly works. A version is also available as The Library of the Palestine Pilgrims' Text Society.

Certain well-known pilgrimages included are those of: Jacques de Vitry, Saint Jerome's Pilgrimage of the Holy Paula, Mukaddasi's description of Syria, and the Itinerarium Burdigalense.

Publications
(1886): Description of Syria, including Palestine by Mukaddasi (c. 985)
(1887): Of the Holy Places visited by Antoninus Martyr by Antoninus of Piacenza, archive.org
(1887): Itinerary from Bordeaux to Jerusalem by "The Bordeaux Pilgrim", (333), archive.org
(1887): 
(1888): Of the Buildings of Justinian by Procopius (c. 560)
(1889): The Letters of Paula and Eustochium to Marcella, about the Holy Places (A.D. 386)
(1889): 
(1890): Description of the Holy Land by John of Würzburg (1160–1170)
(1890): The Epitome of S. Eucherius about certain Holy Places (ca. A.D. 440) and the Breviary or short description of Jerusalem (ca. A.D. 530)

alt.: (1890): The Epitome of S. Eucherius about certain Holy Places (ca. A.D. 440) and the Breviary or short description of Jerusalem (ca. A.D. 530)
(1891): Churches of Constantine at Jerusalem: being translations from Eusenius and the early pilgrims
alt.: (1896): Churches of Constantine at Jerusalem: being translations from Eusenius and the early pilgrims
(1891): The Hodæporicon of Saint Willibald (c. 754) by Huneburc
(1891): The Pilgrimage of S. Silvia of Aquitania to the Holy Places (ca. A.D. 85)
(1891): Description of the Holy Places. (ca. A.D. 1172) by Theoderich
(1892): Saewolf (A.D. 1102, 1103) archive.org
(1893): 
(1893):  with p. 677: Index 
(1893): Theodosius (530)
(1893): The Itinerary of Bernhard the Wise (A.D. 870) How the City of Jerusalem is Situated, (ca. A.D. 1090?) archive.org
(1894): Anonymous Pilgrims, I–VIII (11th and 12th centuries
(1894): 
(1894): Guide-book to Palestine (ca. A.D. 1350) archive.org
(1895):   (about Arculf)
(1895): Extracts from Aristeas, Hecatæus, Origen, and other early writers
alt.: (1895): Extracts from Aristeas, Hecatæus, Origen, and other early writers
(1896): Fetellus (ca. A.D. 1130), Translated and Annotated by Rev. James Rose Macpherson
(1896): 
(1896): 
(1896): The Life of Saladin by Beha Ed-Din (AD 1137–1193) 
(1896): History of Jerusalem by Jacques de Vitry,  1180
 (1896): A Description of the Holy Land by Burchard of Mount Sion.
 (1897): Vol III, The Pilgrimage of Arculfus (1889) The Hodoeporicon of St. Willibald. Description of Syria and Palestine, by Mukaddasi. The Itinerary of Bernhard the Wise.
(1897): Vol IV A Journey through Syria and Palestine. (1888) By Nasir-I-Khusrau. The Pilgrimage of Saewulf to Jerusalem. The Pilgrimage of the Russian abbot Daniel. 
 (1897): Vol VI, Anonymous Pilgrims. (1894) The City of Jerusalem and Ernoul's account of Palestine. The Guide Book to Palestine. Description of the Holy Land, by John Poloner. 
(1897): General Index to the Library of Palestine Pilgrims' Text Society

References

Further reading

See also
 Travelogues of Palestine

External links
 WorldCat listing of the original edition

Medieval literature
Medievalists
1884 establishments in the United Kingdom
1896 disestablishments
Holy Land travellers
Text publication societies